The 2020–21 season was the 98th season of Gençlerbirliği S.K. in existence and the club's second consecutive season in the top flight of Turkish football. In addition to the domestic league, Gençlerbirliği participated in the season's edition of the Turkish Cup. The season covers the period from July 2020 to 30 June 2021.

Players

First-team squad

Out on loan

Pre-season and friendlies

Competitions

Overview

Süper Lig

League table

Results summary

Results by round

Matches

Turkish Cup

Statistics

Appearances and goals
 Players with no appearances not included in the list.

References

External links

Gençlerbirliği seasons
Gençlerbirliği